Jean-Marie le Guillou (born 24 January 1941) is a French sailor who competed in the 1972 Summer Olympics.

References

1941 births
Living people
French male sailors (sport)
Olympic sailors of France
Sailors at the 1972 Summer Olympics – Soling
5.5 Metre class sailors
World Champions in 5.5 Metre
World champions in sailing for France